Carlos Alberto "Capita" Torres (17 July 1944 – 25 October 2016), also known as "O Capitão do Tri", was a Brazilian football player and manager who played as an attacking right-sided full-back or wing-back. A technically gifted defender with good ball skills and defensive capabilities, he is widely regarded as one of the best defenders of all time. He also stood out for his leadership, and was an excellent penalty taker. Nicknamed O Capitão, he captained the Brazil national team to victory in the 1970 World Cup, scoring the fourth goal in the final, considered one of the greatest goals in the history of the tournament.

Carlos Alberto was a member of the World Team of the 20th Century, and in 2004 was named by Pelé in the FIFA 100 list of the world's greatest living players. He was an inductee to the Brazilian Football Museum Hall of Fame, and was a member of the U.S. National Soccer Hall of Fame.

In January 2013, Carlos Alberto was named one of the six Ambassadors of 2014 FIFA World Cup in Brazil, others being Ronaldo, Bebeto, Mário Zagallo, Amarildo and Marta.

Personal life
Carlos Alberto was born in Rio de Janeiro in 1944. He had a twin brother, Carlos Roberto, who died one month before him in 2016. His son is fellow player Carlos Alexandre Torres and his daughter Andrea Torres.

Club career

Brazil
Carlos Alberto joined Fluminense at the age of 19. He made a name for himself in his first season, not only because of his great tackling and reading of the game, but also for his outstanding ball control, dribbling and playmaking abilities, which were quite rare at the time for a defender. In 1966, he moved to Santos, where he became Pelé's teammate. In 1974, he returned to Fluminense and helped the team capture two consecutive Campeonato Carioca championships. In 1977, he moved to Fluminense's arch-rivals Flamengo.

NASL
In 1977, despite his success in Brazil, Carlos Alberto Torres decided to move to the New York Cosmos. He arrived on the day of the New York City blackout where he was reunited with his friend and partner Pelé and helped the Cosmos capture two consecutive NASL titles in 1977 and 1978. After spending one year with the California Surf, he returned to the Cosmos in 1982 where he won his third NASL title. He played his farewell game on 28 September 1982 in an exhibition match between the Cosmos and his former club Flamengo. In 119 regular season games and 26 playoff games, Carlos scored a total of 8 goals and was an NASL All-Star five times.

International career

From 1964 to 1977, Carlos Alberto was capped 53 times and scored 8 goals. He was included in the 44-man training squad for the 1966 FIFA World Cup but did not make the final 22. As it turned out, Brazil were knocked out at the Group stage in England, and when João Saldanha was tasked with restoring pride and passion to the seleção, he recognised the leadership ability that Carlos Alberto was consistently demonstrating at Santos, and made him national captain. Thus, Carlos Alberto is remembered holding aloft the Jules Rimet trophy after Brazil secured the cup for good after an impressive victory over Italy in the 1970 FIFA World Cup Final in Mexico City. That squad also included Clodoaldo, Gérson, Jairzinho, Roberto Rivelino, Tostão and Pelé. Carlos Alberto's goal against Italy in the final is considered one of the best goals ever scored in the tournament. In 2002 the UK public voted the goal No. 36 in the list of the 100 Greatest Sporting Moments. 1970 would prove to be the only time he would play at that level. He was unable to participate in the 1974 World Cup due to a persistent knee injury. When he eventually regained match fitness, his speed had been compromised. However, his ability to read the game compensated for his loss of pace and when he moved to centre back, he found the form to warrant a recall to the national team. In 1977, he was selected by Claudio Coutinho to captain the national team for the first three qualifiers for the 1978 World Cup. He acquitted himself well despite those being the first competitive internationals he had played for almost seven years. He was approaching 33 years of age and retired from international football, immediately prior to joining New York Cosmos in the NASL. Today he is widely considered one of the finest Brazilian footballers of all time.

Coaching career

His career as a football manager started in 1983, when he managed Flamengo. He also managed several other clubs, like Corinthians in 1985 and 1986; Náutico in 1986, 1987 and 1988; Once Caldas on 1989, 1990; Monterrey in 1991, 1992; Club Tijuana in 1992; Fluminense in 1994 and 1995; Botafogo in 1993, 1994, 1997, 1998, 2002 and 2003; Querétaro F.C. in 1999; Unión Magdalena in 2000, 2001; and Paysandu in 2005.

He was also an assistant manager for national teams such as the Nigeria national football team and the Oman national football team. On 14 February 2004, he was appointed manager of the Azerbaijan national football team. He resigned on 4 June 2005 after losing a match against Poland, during which he assaulted the technical referee and ran on the pitch suggesting the referee was bribed.

Death
Carlos Alberto died in Rio de Janeiro on 25 October 2016 due to a sudden heart attack. He was a sports commentator at a Brazilian channel SporTV, having appeared live on studio only two days before his death, which occurred exactly one month after his twin died.

Career statistics

Club

International

Honours
Fluminense
Campeonato Carioca: 1964, 1975, 1976
Taça Guanabara: 1966

Santos
Recopa Sul-Americana: 1968
Taça de Prata: 1968
Paulista Championship: 1967, 1968, 1969, 1973

New York Cosmos
NASL Soccer Bowl Championships: 1977, 1978, 1980, 1982

Brazil
Pan American Games champion: 1963.
FIFA World Cup: 1970

Individual
FIFA World Cup All-Star Team: 1970
World Team of the 20th Century: 1998
National Soccer Hall of Fame: 2003
FIFA 100: 2004
The Best of The Best – Player of the Century: Top 50
Brazilian Football Museum Hall of Fame
Ballon d'Or Dream Team (Silver): 2020
 IFFHS All-time Men's B Dream Team: 2021

Notes

External links

| colspan="3" style="text-align:center;"| World Cup-winners status 
|- 
|  style="width:28%; text-align:center;"| Preceded byBobby Moore1941
|  style="width:44%; text-align:center;"| Latest Born Captain to Die194425 October 2016 – 25 November 2020
|  style="width:28%; text-align:center;"| Succeeded byDiego Maradona1960

 
 
 nasljerseys.com NASL statistics for Carlos Alberto Torres at nasljersey.com

1944 births
2016 deaths
1970 FIFA World Cup players
Brazil international footballers
Brazilian expatriate footballers
Brazilian expatriate sportspeople in the United States
Brazilian football managers
Brazilian footballers
FIFA 100
FIFA World Cup-winning players
FIFA World Cup-winning captains
Association football fullbacks
Association football wingers
National Soccer Hall of Fame members
North American Soccer League (1968–1984) players
North American Soccer League (1968–1984) indoor players
Campeonato Brasileiro Série A players
Campeonato Brasileiro Série A managers
Fluminense FC players
Santos FC players
CR Flamengo footballers
New York Cosmos players
California Surf players
CR Flamengo managers
Sport Club Corinthians Paulista managers
Once Caldas managers
C.F. Monterrey managers
Club Tijuana managers
Botafogo de Futebol e Regatas managers
Fluminense FC managers
Clube Atlético Mineiro managers
Querétaro F.C. managers
Unión Magdalena managers
Oman national football team managers
Paysandu Sport Club managers
Azerbaijan national football team managers
Expatriate football managers in Azerbaijan
Association football commentators
Brazilian expatriate sportspeople in Azerbaijan
Brazilian expatriate sportspeople in Oman
Brazilian expatriate sportspeople in Mexico
Expatriate soccer players in the United States
Expatriate soccer managers in the United States
Brazilian expatriate sportspeople in Colombia
Expatriate football managers in Colombia
Expatriate football managers in Oman
Expatriate football managers in Mexico
Footballers from Rio de Janeiro (city)
Medalists at the 1963 Pan American Games
Pan American Games gold medalists for Brazil
Pan American Games medalists in football
Footballers at the 1963 Pan American Games
Deaths from heart disease